Carlisle is a census-designated place (CDP) in Sequoyah County, Oklahoma, United States. It is part of the Fort Smith, Arkansas-Oklahoma Metropolitan Statistical Area. The population was 606 at the 2010 census.

Geography
Carlile is located at  (35.495325, -95.039503).

Demographics

As of the census of 2000, there were 649 people, 233 households, and 178 families residing in the CDP. The population density was 24.6 people per square mile (9.5/km2). There were 260 housing units at an average density of 9.9/sq mi (3.8/km2). The racial makeup of the CDP was 66.72% White, 3.24% Black or African American, 23.73% Native American, 0.31% Asian, 0.15% from other races, and 5.86% from two or more races. Hispanic or Latino of any race were 2.47% of the population.

There were 233 households, out of which 33.9% had children under the age of 18 living with them, 60.1% were married couples living together, 9.4% had a female householder with no husband present, and 23.6% were non-families. 18.5% of all households were made up of individuals, and 7.7% had someone living alone who was 65 years of age or older. The average household size was 2.79 and the average family size was 3.14.

In the CDP, the population was spread out, with 28.5% under the age of 18, 6.0% from 18 to 24, 25.4% from 25 to 44, 25.1% from 45 to 64, and 14.9% who were 65 years of age or older. The median age was 39 years. For every 100 females, there were 93.2 males. For every 100 females age 18 and over, there were 95.0 males.

The median income for a household in the CDP was $22,109, and the median income for a family was $30,500. Males had a median income of $25,809 versus $37,188 for females. The per capita income for the CDP was $14,798. About 23.1% of families and 28.3% of the population were below the poverty line, including 43.2% of those under age 18 and 17.1% of those age 65 or over.

References

Census-designated places in Sequoyah County, Oklahoma
Census-designated places in Oklahoma
Fort Smith metropolitan area